Usinsk Airport  is an airport in Komi, Russia located 8 km west of Usinsk. It services medium-size airliners.

Airlines and destinations

References

RussianAirFields.com

External links

Airports built in the Soviet Union
Airports in the Komi Republic